Lake Avery is a reservoir in Rio Blanco County, Colorado about 20 miles southeast of the town of Meeker. It also lies west of the unincorporated community of Buford. The reservoir is owned by Colorado Parks and Wildlife, and its dam impounds Big Beaver Creek, a tributary of the White River. Lake Avery is also called Big Beaver Reservoir, however it is unclear whether the name has changed or whether the reservoir just has two names.

State wildlife area
The lake and a large area of land surrounding it are part of the  Oak Ridge State Wildlife Area. The wildlife area comprises six units or divisions, including the Bel Aire Unit, the Lake Avery Unit, the Oak Ridge Unit, the Jon Wangnild Unit, the Sleepy Cat Ponds Unit, and the Sleepy Cat Fishing Easement. The wildlife area offers deer, elk, rabbit, dusky (blue) grouse, dove, and waterfowl hunting, coldwater stream fishing, and camping, hiking, and wildlife viewing. The lake has two boat ramps. Lake Avery contains both rainbow and cutthroat trout.

In 2018, due to dangerously high temperatures and low flow rates in the White River that endangered trout species, Colorado Parks and Wildlife began releasing water from Lake Avery to the White River for the first time since 2012. They were permitted to discharge water at a rate of 20 cubic feet per second for 120 days.

Dam
The dam, called Big Beaver Dam, (National ID # CO00962) is a 102-foot tall earthen dam built in 1964. As of 2022, the  dam is classified as a "high hazard dam" by the State of Colorado due to the property damage it would cause if breached. Its quality has declined over the years; it is currently listed as "unsatisfactory" since the last time the dam underwent maintenance was in the early 1990s to repair leaks. Colorado Parks & Wildlife has stated that they would begin lowering water levels and beginning construction between 2023 and 2024.

References

External links
Oak Ridge State Wildlife Area

Reservoirs in Colorado
Bodies of water of Rio Blanco County, Colorado
Protected areas of Rio Blanco County, Colorado
Buildings and structures in Rio Blanco County, Colorado
Dams in Colorado
Dams completed in 1964